Marie Louise Reilly (born 1 April 1980) is an Irish female rugby union player from Summerhill, County Meath. In 2014, Reilly was named to the tournament Dream Team. She retired from international rugby in 2017 after the Womens Rugby World Cup with 54 caps for Ireland.

Rugby career 
She first began playing rugby union in 2005. Reilly made her international debut in 2010.

Reilly is a Sports Development Officer with the Dublin City Council.

References

External links
IRFU Player Profile

1980 births
Living people
Sportspeople from Yorkshire
Irish female rugby union players
Ireland women's international rugby union players
Leinster Rugby women's players
Old Belvedere R.F.C. players